Ammannur Rajaneesh Chakyar is well known   Kutiyattam artist from Thrissur, Kerala, India. He was trained under his grand uncle Padmabhushan Dr. Guru  Ammannur Madhava Chakyar.  for Fifteen years at Ammannur Gurukulam with the Scholarship from Sangeet Natak Akademi, New Delhi.

After the systematic training under his Guru, he is capable to present different characters with subtle Satwika Abhinaya. He widely performing and teaching in India and Abroad.

Notable roles 

 Ashwatthama in Urubhangam directed by  G Venu of Natanakairali
Kali in  Nala-Damayanthi 
Ravana in Thoranayudham   Kūțiyāțțam (Kailasodharanam and Parvathiviraham)
Parasurāma in Parasurāmavijayam   directed by himself
Bali and Sugreeva in Balivadham Kūțiyāțțam
Ravana and Jatayu in Jatayuvadham Kūțiyāțțam
Shurpanakha with Ninam
Vidūshaka Roles in different Kūțiyāțțam

Reception 
VR Prabodhachandran Nayar from The Hindu remarked "Ammannur Rajaneesh Chakyar enacted these events convincingly and with attention to fine detail such as Kali’s suffering in the scorching summer and the first drop of rain falling on his body."

References

Living people
Artists from Thrissur
Dancers from Kerala
Indian male dancers
1981 births